Iseli is a surname. Notable people with the surname include:

Rolf Iseli (born 1934), Swiss painter
Rolf Iseli, Swiss curler and curling coach
Tee Mac Omatshola Iseli, Nigerian flutist